The Betrayal — Nerakhoon is a 2008 documentary film directed by Ellen Kuras and Thavisouk Phrasavath.

Synopsis
It is about an immigrant from Laos living in New York City. The film centres on the family's flight from Laos after the United States Secret War in Laos and the difficulty of assimilating into American life. Cultural obstacles encountered are presented through the medium of the break-up of the narrators' family, culminating in the death of a family member linked to gang warfare.

In the Lao language, "nerakhoon" translates to "ingratitude" or "betrayal".

Reception

Critical response
The Betrayal has an approval rating of 93% on review aggregator website Rotten Tomatoes, based on 30 reviews, and an average rating of 7.63/10. It also has a score of 78 out of 100 on Metacritic, based on 10 critics, indicating "generally favorable reviews".

Film Festivals and Accolades
The Betrayal won the Spectrum Award at the Full Frame Documentary Film Festival (2008), and screened within such festivals as Maryland Film Festival.

In 2009, The Betrayal – Nerakhoon was Nominated for an Oscar at the 81st Academy Awards for Best Documentary Features.

Also in 2009, The Betrayal was nominated for an Independent Spirit Award.

It was shown in the Documentary Competition at the 2008 Sundance Film Festival.

The Betrayal – Nerakhoon won the 2010 Creative Arts Primetime Emmy Award for Exceptional Merit in Nonfiction Filmmaking.

It also won Student Doc Award at Sheffield Doc/Fest in 2012.

Release
The film was released on home video by The Cinema Guild.

References

External links
 

2008 films
Documentary films about Asian Americans
2008 documentary films
American independent films
Lao-language films
Documentary films about immigration to the United States
Documentary films about families
2008 directorial debut films
2008 independent films
Films scored by Howard Shore
Primetime Emmy Award-winning broadcasts
2000s English-language films
2000s American films